Big Bad Beetleborgs (later Beetleborgs Metallix for Season 2) is an American live-action superhero television series by Saban Entertainment and was co-produced with Renaissance-Atlantic Films, Toei Company and Bugboy Productions. Two seasons aired on Fox Kids from September 7, 1996 to March 2, 1998.

The series adapted combat footage from the Metal Hero tokusatsu-series Juukou B-Fighter (first season) and B-Fighter Kabuto (second season). Unlike its contemporaries, such as Power Rangers, the show had a greater emphasis on sitcom elements, rather than a villain of the week.

Synopsis

Season 1
Set in the fictional town of Charterville, three "typical average kids"—Andrew "Drew" McCormick (Wesley Barker) and his sister Josephine "Jo" McCormick (Shannon Chandler, later Brittany Konarzewski), and their best friend Roland Williams (Herbie Baez)—enter the supposedly haunted Hillhurst Mansion after accepting a dare from rich snobs Van and Trip. The house is revealed to be the home of real monsters in the likes of Universal monsters and are set to eat the kids. However, in the midst of a chase, the kids accidentally bump a pipe organ, releasing a phasm named Flabber (Billy Forester). He proves to be friendly, and in return for releasing him, offers to grant them one wish. They wish to become their comic book heroes, the Big Bad Beetleborgs. However, this also brings the Beetleborgs' sworn enemies to life: the Magnavores, led by the evil Vexor, who would summon monsters from the comic books to battle the Beetleborgs. Roland's family, including his parents and grandmother Nano, run the comic book shop.

In a 6-parter, Vexor created his own Beetleborg, Shadowborg, which was a match for the Beetleborgs and briefly took their powers. They had to call a temporary Beetleborg (White Blaster Beetleborg) Josh Baldwin (Warren Berkow), and after Shadowborg was destroyed, Josh lost his powers. The Beetleborgs would meet the Beetleborgs comic creator, Art Fortunes, during this six-part story in order for him to create the White Blaster Beetleborg and the Mega Blue Beetleborg.

In the penultimate episode of the first season, the Magnavores steal a picture of a new villain named Nukus from Art Fortunes' office. They bring him to life to enlist his help in destroying the Beetleborgs. Nukus assists them by planning devastating attacks on the city and creating Borgslayer, a hybrid of all the Magnavore monsters. Unbeknownst to the Magnavores, Nukus was actually plotting to get rid of them. Nukus tells Trip and Van (who were fleeing Charterville during Borgslayer's attack to their father's country estate) how to defeat Borgslayer, and orders them to take the information to the Beetleborgs. They succeed in destroying Borgslayer, causing the Magnavores to be swept back into the comics.

Season 2
At the start of Season 2, Nukus has challenged the Beetleborgs. Despite Art's warning that Nukus is too powerful, they face him anyway. Nukus quickly wipes them out, destroying their Beetleborgs armor, weapons, and powers in one fell swoop.

These events lead directly into the second season, called Beetleborgs Metallix. Nukus discovers that his creator is actually Art's incarcerated brother Les Fortunes. Nukus busts Les out of prison and uses some of Les' drawings to summon his own group of villains called the Crustaceans. Les now serves Nukus by creating new monsters for him to use. In response to the rise of the Crustaceans, Art creates new powers, armor, vehicles, and weapons, which Flabber then brings to life again for the kids, who rechristen themselves as Beetleborgs Metallix, hence the title.

The battle between the Beetleborgs and the Crustaceans would later escalate after the Fortunes brothers unburied a time capsule containing the Lost Comic; a story both brothers worked on when they were children. Said story featured the Astral Sword that could summon and control the all-mighty Roboborg, if one manages to gather the eight Astral Coins. Nukus summons his own evil team of Borgs from the Lost Comic called the Mantrons, while the Beetleborgs are reinforced by the Astral Borgs. After many battles, the Beetleborgs finally get their hands on the Astral Sword and all eight coins, using it to summon Roboborg, who, soon after, demonstrates his powers by sending the Mantrons back to the Lost Comic.

To fight Roboborg, the Crustaceans eventually created their own giant robot named Boron, while Nukus and Vilor gain upgraded Mega forms. Boron could be summoned and controlled with the Astral Axe. As a response to Nukus' and Vilor's new Mega forms, the Beetleborgs were given an upgrade by Roboborg who fused their Metallix powers with their original powers creating the Mega Spectra Beetleborgs. Vilor's "mega" form did not last long and he quietly returned to his original look without explanation. However, Mega Nukus retained his upgraded look.

The series concluded with the Beetleborgs gaining the enemy Boron as an ally, stripping Nukus of his greatest weapon during the fight against Repgillian. Les Fortunes makes the decision to return willingly to Charterville Prison, disabling Nukus' ability to create new monsters out of illustrations.

Characters

Beetleborgs
 Andrew "Drew" McCormick (portrayed by Wesley Barker) – The Blue Stinger Beetleborg, and later the Chromium Gold Beetleborg in the second season, is the leader of the Beetleborgs. He was granted the ability of telekinesis by Flabber, which he activated by pointing at an object and nodding his head. Drew received an upgrade, Mega Blue Beetleborg, after he used the energy axis that powered Shadowborg on his original armor. After Roboborg arrived, Drew received a new upgrade, Mega Spectra Chromium Gold Beetleborg, after Nukus and Vilor went Mega themselves. His armor was modeled after a Japanese rhinoceros beetle.
 Roland Williams (portrayed by Herbie Baez) – The Green Hunter Beetleborg, and later the Titanium Silver Beetleborg in the second season, his family owns a local comic book shop named Zoom Comics, where he, Jo, and Drew usually hang out. He was granted the ability of super speed by Flabber, which he activated by snapping his fingers. After Roboborg arrived, Roland received an upgrade, Mega Spectra Titanium Silver Beetleborg, after Nukus and Vilor went Mega themselves. His armor was modeled after a stag beetle.
 Josephine "Jo" McCormick (portrayed by Shannon Chandler in episodes 1–39, Brittany Konarzewski in 39–88) – The Red Striker Beetleborg, and later the Platinum Purple Beetleborg in the second season. She is Drew's sister, she was granted the ability of super strength by Flabber, which she activated by cracking her knuckles. After Roboborg arrived, Jo received an upgrade, Mega Spectra Platinum Purple Beetleborg, after Nukus and Vilor went Mega themselves. Her Red Striker armor was modeled after a female Japanese rhinoceros beetle, and her Platinum Purple armor after a ladybug. Jo is often shown wearing a baseball cap backwards. A unique casting change occurred and instead of an official departure removing the character Jo from the cast, when Shannon Chandler left the series, her character remained. Halfway through Season 1, Wolfgang (while playing with a magic book) accidentally cast a spell that caused Jo to permanently change in appearance. Brittany Konarzewski took over Chandler's role in the guise of actually being the original Jo with a new look and voice. To counteract this, Flabber used his magic to make her look and sound the way she always had, but it didn't work on anyone who actually watched the spell being cast. So the viewers, Flabber, Drew, Roland, and Jo herself could still see Jo in her new appearance, but the Hilhurst monsters as well as their family and friends saw her as she looked before. According to Flabber, the spell would eventually wear off which hasn't been seen during the series.
 Josh Baldwin (portrayed by Warren Berkow) – The White Blaster Beetleborg, granted the ability of invisibility by Flabber, which he activated by dusting his hands. He was on the team for a very short period of time. The White Blaster Beetleborg was created after Shadowborg, an evil clone of the Beetleborgs, stole their powers. He succeeded in getting their powers back. However, it was soon discovered that the White Blaster and Shadowborg were linked in a fashion of yin and yang (mainly because the White Blaster powers were created solely to battle Shadowborg), meaning if one was destroyed, the other would lose his power forever (it could be assumed that it didn't really bother him, seeing as he felt he couldn't handle a superhero life). Josh and Drew were rivals to fall for Heather. Josh accompanied the Beetleborgs in the final battle against Shadowborg, where he transformed for the final time. Shadowborg was defeated by Drew (in his Mega Blue Beetleborg form) and due to the link, Josh lost his powers at which point Josh returned to a normal life. Josh has suggested to Art Fortunes that he should include the White Blaster Beetleborg in his later comics alongside the Mega Blue Beetleborg form. Although he said that if the others ever needed him again, he'd be there (but this was the last we saw of him). It was slightly hinted that Jo had a crush on him. His armour was modeled after a Hercules beetle.

Hillhurst Inhabitants
An old mansion outside of Charterville had fallen into disrepair since the passing of Old Man Hillhurst and became home to some rather goofy monsters. With the exception of Flabber, all the monsters attempt to eat any humans who trespass in their home. As a running gag, they never learn their lesson about trying to go after the Beetleborgs who always manage to outwit or clobber them. Wolfgang and Little Ghoul later move in throughout the series.

 Flabber (portrayed by Billy Forester) – As described above, Flabber is a phantasm (phasm) who was trapped inside a pipe organ, and was freed by the kids. Out of gratitude he granted their wish to become their comic book heroes, the Big Bad Beetleborgs. This event also unintentionally released the Magnavores. Flabber was released by playing 3 notes on the organ. (He later revealed that playing those same 3 notes, then playing them in reverse would re-entrap him inside the organ). He acts as an advisor and best friend, and offers needed magic to the kids when fighting the Magnavores, and later the Crustaceans, though his magic does not always work the way he may hope for it to work. He is the head of the Hillhurst Mansion and is usually the one to keep the house monsters in check. The producers of the show said that he was based on Elvis Presley.
 Mums (voiced by Michael Sorich in the pilot episode, performed by Blake Torney in later episodes) – Mums is a 5,000-year-old Egyptian mummy that used to be a prince, but he can unwrap his bandages to reveal a "Grim Reaper"-like form under his bandages (which only occurred once) and is considered more scary. He has 703 brothers and sisters. In "Curse of the Mums' Tomb," two archaeologists came to return Mums to the crypt in which they found him in order to get rid of a curse placed on them upon waking him. He would need a "magical beetle", but using a Beetleborg would cause loss of their powers. In the same episode, Mums mentions that he was mummified alive after he was caught kissing Cleopatra in public. His mother also has a family heirloom that can turn others (such as Fangula) into monsters by shouting "Eureka!"
 Frankenbeans (performed by David Fletcher) – Frankenbeans (called "Frankie" for short) is a strange, lumbering Frankenstein's monster-type monster. He was once kidnapped by the Magnavores on Halloween, and held for ransom in exchange for the Beetleborgs' Beetle Bonders. He allows Wolfie to stay in a dog house kept in his room. He has little ability to speak, often roaring or saying toddler-like sentences; in short, he's the more stupid of the monsters. He actually has no brain (literally), something that often causes a lot of jokes involving him (but a benefit in one episode, as it made him immune to the attack of the "Brain-Sucker" monster created by Nukus). His creator Dr. Baron von Frankenbeans showed up in a few episodes.
 Count Fangula (portrayed by Joe Hackett) – Loosely modeled after Count Dracula, Count Fangula is a vampire (albeit one of questionable aptitude in the Dark Arts). He seems to be the only one to understand what Wolfie may be saying. He mentioned in Wolfie's introductory episode that they were roommates "in the old country." He once succeeded into getting two victims in Van and Trip, temporarily turning them into vampires that were turned back to normal by kisses from Jo. If his victims quota is too low, a high ranking vampire will come to evaluate him like his boss Vlad did in "Fangula's Last Bite." He's also known to have an ex-wife who he's very afraid of.
 The Pipettes (portrayed by Traci Bellusci) – A multicolor spirit-like trio of ladies who live in the pipe organ. They look identical except for the colors. The Pipettes act as Flabber's back-up singers. They were later dropped halfway through the first series.
 Ghoulum (performed by Dan Letlow) – A living stone statue monster that resides in Hillhurst Mansion who often had little to say or do other than what statues do best, stand in place. While not the most active monster of Hillhurst Mansion on rare occasions, he would join in on the other monsters' mischief. In one episode, he was accidentally exposed to a "Bad Potion" turning him evil and causing him to grow to giant-size and fall under Noxic's control.
 Wolfgang "Wolfie" Smith (performed by Frank Tahoe, voiced by Michael Sorich in the first appearance, Scott Page-Pagter in later appearances) – Wolfie is a werewolf and is treated more like a family dog than a monster at Hillhurst. His voice sounds similar to Scooby-Doo. Only Fangula can translate what Wolfie is saying most of the time since Fangula was once Wolfie's roommate. Probably the bravest and most cunning of the Hillhurst Monsters because he's the only one of the group who tangled with the bad guys at least once. Wolfie was once responsible for using a spellbook to accidentally change Jo's appearance which got him in trouble with Flabber. He bargained with the Beetleborgs to be let on a mission with them in exchange for the final Astralborg coin he was ransoming.
 Little Ghoul (portrayed by Lina Godouse) – A Jawa-like ghoul who was the latest addition to the Hillhurst group in season two. She lives in the basement and rarely comes out. As the niece of the Grim Reaper, Little Ghoul is a grim reaper-in-training who loves collecting. She also has a short temper, which scares the other monsters even more than her true appearance under her hood. She has little to no respect for anyone. She does however have a great deal of respect for the Astralborgs. In one episode, she possessed a head that originally belonged to the Headless Horseman. In another episode, Little Ghoul became attached to a monster she named Emily after it bloomed from the Seed of Evil which Horribelle had given her during her brief obsession with gardening.

Supporting characters
 "Nano" Williams (portrayed by Vivian Smallwood) – Roland's paternal grandmother, Aaron's mother, and Abbie's mother-in-law. Nano is one hip granny and a trained martial artist. When she's not running Zoom Comics or practicing her moves, she's often seen riding her motorcycle. Nano often helps out the kids when they're in a jam. If nothing else, she enjoys teasing her son Aaron.
 Aaron Williams (portrayed by Kim Delgado) – Roland's father, Abbie's husband, and Nano's son. He ran Zoom Comics full-time and is often embarrassed by his mother's antics. Aaron was soon called away on business halfway through season one, leaving the shop in the hands of his wife Abbie.
 Abbie Williams (portrayed by Channe Nolen) – Roland's mother and Nano's daughter-in-law. She primarily works as a real estate agent. When her husband Aaron gone on business, she assumed running Zoom Comics. She and her mother in-law don't see eye to eye, but she didn't really know how to run a comic book shop. With a little help from Flabber's magic, Abbie's heart opened up and rekindled fond childhood memories of a comic she once loved reading. She ran the shop for the remainder of the series.
 Heather (portrayed by Elizabeth Z. Lund) – Drew's crush. No matter what Happened, Drew could never really tell Heather what he really felt. She would sometimes help out at the comic shop, and she also enjoyed reading them. During the Shadowborg saga, she developed a crush on Josh.
 Trip and Van (portrayed by Todd Hurst and Patrick Seaborn) – These brothers constantly pestered the kids' daily lives by flaunting their wealth and self-acclaimed superiority. Trip was the smarter of the two whereas Van was a bit slow. They often came up with get-rich-quick schemes, ways to humiliate the kids, or simply to cause trouble where they would often drag Dudley into their schemes. They were the one's who dared Jo, Roland, and Drew to enter Hillhurst, which led to them becoming Beetleborgs. During the Borgslayer fiasco, they left town to go live at their father's country estate. Before they left town, Nukus forced them to return to town to tell the Beetleborgs how to defeat Borgslayer in order to get rid of the Magnavores. The two of them were dropped after season one and are only mentioned once in season two.
 Dudley (portrayed by Dudley Davis) – Dudley is the chauffeur who works for Trip and Van's parents. He would be unwittingly dragged into Trip and Van's schemes. Like Trip and Van, Dudley isn't seen again after season one.
 Dr. Baron von Frankenbeans (portrayed by Don Altman) – A mad scientist who is based on Victor Frankenstein and is the creator of Frankenbeans. He treated the monsters like servants. Whenever he announced his full name, he would be spotlighted by moonlight as lightning would flash and a wolf would howl outside (even if it was daylight). He first appeared to visit his son and do medical treatment on the monsters. Dr. Frankenbeans even helped the Beetleborgs by giving them a suggestion on how to defeat Cyber-Serpent by opening fire on him while he's standing over his comic. In "Operation Frankenbeans," Dr. Frankenbeans returned where he implanted a new brain into Frankenbeans. While it made Frankenbeans smart, it also made him not see Dr. Frankenbeans as his father. This lasted until Frankenbeans fell down the stairs, hit his head, and go back to his original intellect. In "Bride of Frankenbeans," Dr. Frankenbeans returned where he had assembled a mate for Frankenbeans (who was based on the Bride of Frankenstein). Even though the Beetleborgs stopped Crimson Creep from crashing the wedding, Frankenbeans' relationship with the "bride" was short and she was deactivated and dismantled by Dr. Frankenbeans. In "Son of Frankenbeans," Dr. Frankenbeans returned where he had created a "brother" for Frankenbeans. In "Experiment of Evil," Dr. Frankenbeans created the "Monster Mother: Root of all Evil" for the Hillhurst monster who wanted to end the danger posed to their home. He claims that in order to defeat evil, one must be eviler.
 Arthur "Art" Fortunes (portrayed by Rigg Kennedy) – Creator of the Beetleborgs comics who shows up time and time again with new ways to help the kids. He often collaborates with Flabber's magic to bring new arsenal to the kids. Art Fortunes has a brother named Les Fortunes where they had a sibling rivalry. When they were young, Art and Les had a brief collaboration on the "Lost Comic" where Art created the Astralborgs and Les created the Mantrons. A running gag is that the Hillhurst monsters focus on trying to eat him instead of the kids when they're out fighting the villains.
 Karato (voiced by Richard Epcar) and Silver Ray – Two other comic book superheroes that the kids are fans of. When the Magnavores released an army of monsters while trying to kidnap Art Fortunes from a comic book convention, the Beetleborgs were afraid of being unable to beat them all by themselves. Flabber agreed to use his magic on just that one occasion to summon other superheroes from the comics to help. In B-Fighter, Karato was one of the other Metal Hero protagonists Janperson while Silver Ray was his rival-turned ally Gun Gibson, and Goldex was the main villain Bill Goldy (used by the villains as a pawn after being revived), but was absorbed into Borgslayer. The B-Fighters also teamed up with the Blue SWAT team, but they weren't adapted into Beetleborgs.
 Astralborgs – Four heroes of the Lost Comic that were created by Art Fortunes and Les Fortunes. When the Beetleborgs acquired their coins, they are able to summon the Astralborgs to help them fight Nukus' forces.
 Dragonborg (voiced by Doug Stone impersonating Sean Connery) – Modeled after a dragonfly, Dragonborg is the leader of the Astralborgs. His astral laser comes with a powerful sting.
 Fireborg (voiced by Gene Holliday) – An Astralborg that is modeled after a firefly. He can shoot balls of fire from his fingertips.
 Lightingborg (voiced by Richard Epcar) – An Astralborg who is modeled after a cicada. He can shoot electrical currents from the blades of his two swords or the antennae on his helmet.
 Ladyborg (voiced by Barbara Goodson) – An Astralborg who is modeled after a butterfly. Her large cannon opens up like a flower to fire a powerful beam.

Villains
 Magnavores (2–53) – The first set of villains the Beetleborgs faced, who originated from the Beetleborgs comic series. They were released due to Flabber granting the kids' wish which unintentionally released them. While in Charterville, the Magnavores use the old Charterville cemetery as their lair. By the end of Season One, the Magnavores were sent back into the comics as a side effect of Borgslayer's destruction.
 Vexor (first performed by Rick Tane and later by Kisu, voiced by Joey Pal) – The leader of the Magnavores. He loses patience with his Magnavores' incompetence and does not appear in every episode. He appeared to have been destroyed by the combined efforts of all three Beetleborgs stabbing their Beetle Battlers into his body and pulling him to the ground, after Drew battled with and destroyed Shadowborg, but quickly revived himself, sprouting a new body and face and even managed to grow giant. In his following appearance, he somehow switched back to his old self/appearance.
 Typhus (performed by Kyle Jordan, voiced by Dave "Foots" Footman) – A Chimera-like humanoid monster, prefers brawn over brain and his whale-like flattop is an extra mouth with which he eats food or other objects. In battle, he sometimes wields a sword-like weapon that latches to his arm or his mouth. This weapon can also blast lasers when latched to his extra mouth. On one occasion, he emitted bees from his extra mouth. He was temporarily turned into Mega Typhus.
 Noxic (performed by Lee Whey, voiced by David Umansky) – An android with coils for hair who wears a white labcoat-like jacket. He can control machinery and other objects by removing his head and attaching it to them. In a dream of his, Noxic took control of a bulldozer with his head and tried to destroy the Beetleborgs. He later used this same technique to take control of Ghoulum, when he went bad from the "Bad Potion." He has an unseen wicked friend from the comic books as well named Dr. Cackle who created the Bad Potion. Noxic prefers to eat donuts all day long instead of doing Vexor's bidding. He has an older brother named Super Noxic though technically Noxic was created first. In battle, he sometimes wields an umbrella-like weapon.
 Jara (performed by Balinda English in U.S. Footage, voiced by Rajia Baroudi) - A female humanoid clad in red attire and a white mask. She speaks with a Russian accent. Despite her face being remade 3-dimensional, she cannot consume food or smile in the real world because the mouth on her mask could never open (she emphasizes this by saying that she has no mouth). She was bitten by Wolfgang in one episode and became a werewolf and enamored with Wolfgang. By the end of the episode, Jara was returned to her normal form by a rubber arrow shot by Flabber which contained antidote and retained none of her affection for Wolfgang. In battle, she sometimes wields a whip that when cracked releases destructive energy.
 Shadowborg (voiced by Bob Papenbrook) (26–31) – A black evil Beetleborg created by Vexor from ionic DNA and insectite material stolen from the Blue Stinger Beetleborg. Not only is Shadowborg created from the basic materials as Blue Stinger, but he is enhanced with some of the powers of the other Beetleborgs. Shadowborg can run faster than the Green Hunter, jump higher than Red Striker, and remain underwater for 51 minutes. Shadowborg's architectural armor is modeled after a longicorn beetle. With his Shadow Claw, Shadowborg can cut through any substance known to the planet. He was finally destroyed by the Blue Stinger Beetleborg in his Mega Blue Form.
 Scabs (3–53) – Yellow-black creatures who are the foot soldiers of the Magnavores. Unlike in most Saban adaptations, these grunt soldiers were barely used.
 Magnavore Jet Fighters (3–53)- Air-borne, wasp-resembling machine jets. Summoned to attack the Beetleborgs on several occasions.
 Crustaceans (52–88) – Villains created by Les Fortunes, the second set of villains the Beetleborgs faced. After the Magnavores were defeated, the "Crustaceans" used the old Charterville cemetery as their lair.
 Nukus (performed and voiced by Christopher Cho) (52–81) – A creation of Les Fortunes, Nukus is the Triceratops-based Overlord of the 2nd Dimension. His drawing was hidden away in Art Fortune's vault until the Magnavores took the picture and Vexor brought him to life. Nukus quickly set a plan to dispose the Magnavores and take over as the new villain which involved combining the energies of the monsters to create Borgslayer. When Borgslayer was destroyed, the Magnavores returned to the comics and Nukus went to confront the Beetleborgs. Nukus had an advantage over the Beetleborgs as he destroyed both the paper he came out of and the Beetleborgs' original armor, weapons, and powers. When he raided Hillhurst, Nukus turned Flabber into ice and discovered Art Fortunes with another picture of Nukus which was actually drawn by his brother Les. With this knowledge, Nukus broke Les out of prison, brought Horribelle, Vilor, and the Dregs to life, and used Les' skills to create deadly monsters that could be brought to life with the use of his sword where he would say the name of Les' creation and quote "Arise" where the drawing came to life. He later gained a mega form called Mega Nukus (81–88) from touching Les Fortunes' transmographier device which he destroyed soon after to ensure no one else received an upgrade from it.
 Horribelle (performed and voiced by Claudine Barros) (54–88) – An insect-based sword-toting fighter and Nukus' right-hand woman upon being brought to life by Nukus from Les' drawing of her. Like Nukus, she can summon a face-mask in battle. She also wields two swords that resemble mantis arms. Horribelle once rebelled against the Crustaceans by having Les Fortunes create the Astral Axe so she could control its powers out of a scorn for not receiving a mega form like the main male villains.
 Vilor (performed by Kyle Jordan, voiced by Dave "Foots" Footman) (54–88) – A fish-based and trident-toting fighter. He was created by Les in prison and brought to life by Nukus. Vilor briefly gains a second form called Super Vilor in "Wolfie's Wild Ride" in which while the Mantrons takeover fighting, he makes Les Fortunes a deal: a new form in exchange for a new drawing table. Vilor manages to persuade Nukus to make this upgrade happen. When defeated Super Vilor returned to where the drawing was made, he falls on Les Fortunes' new drawing table as regular Vilor. Later, Vilor got a brief mega form called Mega Vilor after touching Les Fortunes' transmographier device prior to its destruction. Though he somehow reverted to his normal state.
 Lester "Les" Fortunes (portrayed by Marshal Hilton) (54–88) – The black sheep in the Fortunes family and Art's older brother who has the same artistic talents as his brother. When they were young, Les and Art had a brief collaboration on the "Lost Comic" where Art created the Astralborgs and Les created the Mantrons. Les was responsible for drawing the picture of Nukus which the Magnavores brought to life. He was in prison when Nukus recruited him to his cause. Despite creating Horribelle, Vilor, the Dregs, and all the Crustacean monsters and their arsenal, Les never gets any respect or credit for it. After Repgillian's destruction, Les and Nukus decided to finally part ways after Les decided to go back to jail for some peace and quiet. He remarked that the Crustaceans were going to miss him while stating that he created them and he can erase them. As he left, Horribelle remarked she never really did like him.
 Mantrons (75–82) – Evil counterparts of the Astralborgs. Created by Les Fortunes as a child to rival Art Fortunes' Astralborgs in their only collaboration the Lost Comic. They were there to aid Nukus in his plans to get Roboborg who ultimately made it to the good hands of the Beetleborgs. In "Roboborg" (part 8 of the Lost Comic saga), the Mantrons were finally sent back to the Lost Comic for good by the combined attacks of the Beetleborgs, Astralborgs, and Roboborg.
 Scorpix (voiced by Bob Papenbrook) – Modeled after a scorpion, Scorpix is the leader of the Mantrons.
 Centipix (voiced by Lee Hondo Woodford) – A Mantron that is modeled after a centipede.
 Mantix (voiced by Ethan Murray) – A Mantron that is modeled after a mantis.
 Hornix (voiced by Bob Johnson) – A Mantron that is modeled after a hornet.
 Dregs (55–88) – Assorted monsters used as foot soldiers that were created by Les Fortunes when he was in jail and brought to life by Nukus. Dregs came in two groups. One group was based on land animals and wore brown slacks and black boots (consisting of the Ptera Dreg, the Spider Dreg, and the Stego Dreg). The other based on sea creatures and wore blue spandex pants and white boots (consisting of the Fish Dreg, Jellyfish Dreg, and Squid Dreg).
 Worm Tanks (55–88) – Giant worm like vehicles summoned to attack the Beetleborgs on several occasions.
 Crustacean Jet Fighters (56–88) – Air-borne machines based on the design of the Worm Tank summoned to attack the Beetleborgs on several occasions.

Monsters

Production
It was not uncommon to see cardboard cut-outs and wall decorations of the Beetleborgs characters on the walls of Zoom Comics where the three kids worked. Other decorations used included the costume heads of King Sphinx of Mighty Morphin Power Rangers and the original head from the monster costume Kappa from Ninja Sentai Kakuranger (the monster was used as "Parrot Top" in MMPR) whose body was used to create the costume Malavex. Toys from the Bandai Beetleborgs toyline could also be seen in various displays. Including the Special Edition Deluxe Shadowborg figure, in an episode which preceded Shadowborg's character ever appearing on the show.

Like other adaptations, some of the original source footage was altered for Beetleborgs. The Input Magnums, the original B-Fighter's guns, looked very realistic due to the black-and-silver coloring. In Beetleborgs, the Sonic Laser's colors were changed to bright red and purple, and all Japanese footage of the Input Magnum's keypad being used was replaced with American footage using the red and purple gun. However, the colors of the guns changed from time to time due to the blending in of the B-Fighter footage. Similarly, the American version of the toy was done in red and purple colors instead of the Input Magnum's black and silver coloring. In Metallix, the Data Laser's colors remained unchanged (silver and black), but the toy line changed the weapons to a white-and-blue color scheme. More violent scenes from B-Fighter were either covered up with large, Batman-esque sound effects or were cut out through comic-book-panel transitions.

The episode "Convention Dimension" had The Beetleborgs attending the comic convention. Among costumes worn at the convention were: Spider-Man, The Tick and Guido Anchovy. At that time Saban owned airing rights to Spider-Man: The Animated Series, The Tick and Samurai Pizza Cats. In Episode 54, Saban featured in "Gravesoul Owns."

Big Bad Beetleborgs and Beetleborgs Metallix ultimately ended because the Saban crew were left with no more Juukou B-Fighter and B-Fighter Kabuto footage to adapt. Their predecessor VR Troopers also ended for the same reason.

Music
The show's theme music was performed by Jeremy Sweet and series star Billy Forester. A newer version of the song was made for the Beetleborgs Metallix episodes. The background score, composed by Inon Zur, had several cues which were also used on Saban's concurrent Power Rangers Turbo. Currently, Beetleborgs has never had any official soundtrack releases.

Reuse of Monsters
Various monster suits from both Beetleborgs seasons were re-used along with un-used Juukou B-Fighter and B-Fighter Kabuto monsters as enemy monsters in the Power Rangers series:

 In Power Rangers in Space, Terror Bear, Triplesaurus Rex, a Stego Dreg, Count Fangula's Bat Monster form, and unused B-Fighter Kabuto monster Flame Ant Beast Baeria (who was repainted and referred to as "Aunt Ant" by Darkonda) were seen at the Onyx Tavern in "Flashes of Darkonda." Also in that episode, the suit for Hammerhands was combined with hands from Power Rangers Zeo monster Googleheimer the Toy Robot while the body of a Ptera Dreg was combined with the head of Power Rangers Turbo monster Dreadfeather. In "Invasion of the Body Switcher," the monsters Body Switcher transformed into included Cataclaws, LottaMuggs, Unctuous, and Firecat as well as a monster with the head and body of Rocket Man and the recolored hands of Green Cannon Machine. In "A Date with Danger," Mole Monster was used as Destructoid where the monster suit was given a different hair style. In the two-part episode "Countdown to Destruction," Aqualungs, Cataclazmic, Changeling, Crimson Creep, Furocious, Hagfish of Gar, Kombat Knat, LottaMuggs, Porkasaurus, Repgillian, Torch Mouth, Triplesaurus Rex, Ultra Vulture, and Unctuous were each seen with each army. Unused B-Fighter Kabuto monsters Changing Body Beast Isogilala, Water Dwelling Beast Kapparapa, and Heat Fruit Beast Pineappler also appeared in the episode.
 In National Lampoon and Saban Entertainment's Men in White, the costumes for Kombat Knat and Furocious were used as two of the aliens that work for Glaxxon.
 In Power Rangers Lost Galaxy, a Stego Dreg, Cataclaws, and Ultra Vulture were seen at the Onyx Tavern. Cataclaws and Furocious were seen at the auction of the Pink Quasar Saber there. Unused B-Fighter Kabuto monster Darkness Combined Beast Tokasuzura also appeared as Rojomon.
 Some of the monsters costumes from Beetleborgs appeared in Mystic Knights of Tir Na Nog with some of them in repainted form. Among these costumes are Scorpix, Shellator, Emily the Seed of Evil, Count Fangula's Bat Monster form, and 2 monsters from B-Fighter Kabuto that were unused in this series (the ant monster Flame Ant Beast Baeria and the porcupine/stingray monster Darkness Combined Beast Arajibiray). The costumes for Shellator, Count Fangula's Bat Monster form, and B-Fighter monsters Flame Ant Beast Baeria and Darkness Combined Beast Arajibiray were used to portray the Spectres of the Banshee Woods in "The Mystic Knight of Forest." The costume for Emily the Seed of Evil was repainted and used for an unnamed spikey warrior in "Ivar's Revenge."
 In Power Rangers Lightspeed Rescue, Borgslayer, Crimson Creep, Emily the Seed of Evil, Hagfish of Gar, and Torch Mouth were seen in the Shadow World in "The Fate of Lightspeed" Pt. 2.
 Five Beetleborgs suits were re-used in the Power Rangers Wild Force episode Forever Red as remnants of the Machine Empire who would plan to reactivate Serpentera. Shadowborg's suit was used for General Venjix, Ladyborg's suit was used for Tezzla, Green Hunter Borg's suit was used for Gerrok, Dragonborg's suit was used for Steelon with the dragonfly wings on the head not being seen, and Automon has the head of Fireborg and the body of Lightningborg.
 In Power Rangers S.P.D.. Mucant appeared at Piggy's diner in "Shadow" Pt. 1. El Scorpio was re-used in the episode "S.W.A.T." Part 1 as the holographic sea scorpion monster that Sergent Silverback used as a way to train the Rangers to use S.W.A.T. Mode.

On location
The show was filmed in a number of locations.

 Much of the show was filmed in Santa Paula, California, a small rural town in Ventura County.

Power Rangers Turbo vs. Beetleborgs Metallix
In 1997, Acclaim Comics published a one-shot entitled Power Rangers Turbo vs. Beetleborgs Metallix featuring the Beetleborgs battling the Turbo Rangers before teaming with them against Divatox and Nukus.

Release history
After ending a two-season run on the Fox network, the series was rerun on UPN Kids from 1998 to 1999. In Australia, Big Bad Beetleborgs began airing on Network Ten's Cheez TV morning block during February 1998. In Europe, the series aired on the international version of Fox Kids, which was later rebranded as Jetix. Bettleborgs was also aired in the Philippines on GMA Network from 1997 to 1999. On May 7, 2010, as part of the sale of the Power Rangers franchise, the copyright for Beetleborgs was transferred from BVS Entertainment to Saban Capital Group. In 2018, the rights were transferred to Hasbro, as part of the acquisition of the Power Rangers brand, which included related intellectual property & content libraries previously owned by Saban Properties.

On June 15, 2011, all episodes of Big Bad Beetleborgs and Beetleborgs Metallix were made available on Netflix until February 1, 2021.

There have been 3 VHS releases in the US and Australia: The Curse of Shadow Borg, The Vampire Files, and Metallix – The Movie. They were all released by 20th Century Fox Home Entertainment.

Shout! Factory began putting the series out on DVD with the October 16, 2012 release of Beetleborgs: Season 1, Part 1.  Season 1, Part 2 was released on February 12, 2013. Season 2, Part 1 was released on June 11, 2013. Season 2, Part 2 was released on May 5, 2015.

Notes

References

External links

 Big Bad Beetleborgs Page on Toku Central
 Beetleborgs Metallix Page on Toku Central
 
 

 
Fox Broadcasting Company original programming
1990s American children's television series
1990s American science fiction television series
1996 American television series debuts
1998 American television series endings
American children's action television series
American children's adventure television series
American children's comedy television series
American children's fantasy television series
American children's horror television series
American children's science fiction television series
American superhero television series
American television shows featuring puppetry
American television series based on Japanese television series
English-language television shows
Fox Kids
Japan in non-Japanese culture
Martial arts television series
Metal Hero Series
Television shows about comics
Television series created by Haim Saban
Television series about insects
Television series about siblings
UPN Kids
Hasbro brands
Television series by Saban Entertainment